The Caitiff Choir is the debut full-length album by the band It Dies Today. It was released on September 21, 2004 via Trustkill Records. "A Threnody for Modern Romance" served as the album's lead single, followed by "Severed Ties Yield Severed Heads" Music videos were released for both tracks.

On March 21, 2006, the album was re-released with a new artwork, a slightly different mix, and seven bonus tracks. These tracks consist of the re-recorded version of the Forever Scorned EP, as well as cover of Depeche Mode's "Enjoy the Silence." It is also packaged with a DVD that has three music videos and behind-the-scenes material.

In 2008, Trustkill released the album on vinyl as double-LP set featuring both The Caitiff Choir and Forever Scorned. Two versions exist; a yellow and dark gray version and a blue and light gray version.

Track listing

Personnel

Band
Nicholas Brooks - vocals
Christopher Cappelli - guitar
Steve Lemke - bass guitar
Mike Hatalak - guitar
Nick Mirusso - drums

Other
Tony Gammalo - production, recording, engineering, backup vocals on "The Radiance", "Marigold" and "Freak Gasoline Fight Accident", guitar solo on "A Threnody for Modern Romance"
Tom Hutten - mastering
Aaron Marsh - art, photography, design
Staci Holahan - band photography

It Dies Today albums
2004 debut albums
Trustkill Records albums